Tomaž Murko (born 7 February 1979) is a Slovenian football goalkeeper who plays for Gerečja vas. During most of his career, Murko was a member of Maribor, where he played during the 1990s and 2000s and has made 130 league appearances for the club. With Maribor, he has won seven Slovenian championships and three Slovenian cups.

Honours
Maribor
Slovenian Championship: 1996–97, 1997–98, 1998–99, 1999–2000, 2000–01, 2001–02, 2002–03
Slovenian Cup: 1996–97, 1998–99, 2003–04

Aluminij
Slovenian Second League: 2010–11, 2011–12

References

External links
NZS profile 
NK Maribor profile 

1979 births
Living people
Slovenian footballers
Association football goalkeepers
NK Maribor players
NK Drava Ptuj players
NK Nafta Lendava players
NK Aluminij players
Slovenian PrvaLiga players
Slovenian Second League players
Slovenia youth international footballers
Slovenia under-21 international footballers